Rakovice is a municipality and village in Písek District in the South Bohemian Region of the Czech Republic. It has about 200 inhabitants.

History
In the Rakovice watermill, on 12 May 1945, the commander of the German Waffen-SS army Carl Friedrich von Pückler-Burghauss signed the capitulation and thus ended the Battle of Slivice, which was the last battle of World War II in Europe.

Twin towns – sister cities

Rakovice is twinned with:
 Rakovice, Slovakia

References

Villages in Písek District